The 2017 Northwestern State Demons football team represented Northwestern State University as a member of the Southland Conference during the 2017 NCAA Division I FCS football season. Led by Jay Thomas in his fifth and final season as head coach, the Demons compiled an overall record of 4–7 with a mark of 4–5 in conference play, tying for sixth place in the Southland. Northwestern State played home games at Harry Turpin Stadium in Natchitoches, Louisiana.

Thomas's contract was renewed after the season. He finished his tenure as Northwestern State with a five-year record of 21–36.

Schedule

References

Northwestern State
Northwestern State Demons football seasons
Northwestern State Demons football